Acacia courtii, also commonly known as Northern Brother wattle or North Brother wattle, is a tree belonging to the genus Acacia and the subgenus Juliflorae that is native to eastern Australia. It is currently listed as vulnerable by the Environment Protection and Biodiversity Conservation Act 1999.

Description
Like most species of Acacia it has phyllodes rather than true leaves. The glaucous, evergreen and flexible phyllodes have a linear shape and straight with a small hook at the end. After flowering straight woody seed pods form that have a linear shape.

Taxonomy
The specific epithet honours the botanist Arthur Bertram Court who was once the Assistant Director of the Australian National Botanic Gardens. It is closely related to Acacia orites.

Distribution
It is endemic to a small area in mid north coast region of New South Wales around Laurieton, Kendall and Kew where it is mostly situated on rocky hillsides among the coastal ranges in three small locations where it is a part of dry forests and woodland communities. Six main populations are known mostly in the Kerewong State Forest and around North Brother Mountain and Mid Brother Mountain. It is often associated with species of Eucalyptus including; Eucalyptus acmenoides, Eucalyptus gummifera, Eucalyptus intermedia, Eucalyptus siderophloia and Eucalyptus umbra. Other species commonly found in its habitat include; Allocasuarina torulosa, Helichrysum elatum, Imperata cylindrica, Syncarpia glomulifera and Themeda australis.

See also
List of Acacia species

References

courtii
Flora of New South Wales
Plants described in 1990